Waleed Al-Shangeati (born 9 January 1994) is a Saudi Arabian professional footballer who plays as a striker for Al-Adalah.

Career
Al-Shangeati began his career at the youth team of Ohod. On 30 January 2013, Al-Shangeati left Ohod and joined the U23 team of Al-Shabab. On 4 August 2016, Al-Shangeati joined Najran on a season-long loan. On 20 June 2017, Al-Shangeati joined Al-Qadsiah on a five-year deal. On 12 July 2018, Al-Shangeati joined Al-Washm on loan. On 29 July 2019, Al-Shangeati returned to Najran for a second loan spell. On 20 January 2020, Al-Shangeati was recalled from his loan by Al-Qadsiah. He scored two goals in 10 appearances as Al-Qadsiah earned promotion to the Pro League. On 16 January 2022, Al-Shangeati joined Al-Adalah. He scored three goals in 18 appearances for the club and helped them achieve promotion to the Pro League.

Honours
Al-Qadsiah
 First Division runner-up: 2019–20

Al-Adalah
 First Division runner-up: 2021–22

References

External links 
 

1994 births
Living people
Saudi Arabian footballers
Ohod Club players
Al-Shabab FC (Riyadh) players
Najran SC players
Al-Qadsiah FC players
Al-Washm Club players
Al-Adalah FC players
Saudi First Division League players
Saudi Professional League players
Association football forwards